Elizabeth Bardsley is an English media and television personality who rose to fame after appearing in the Channel 4 series Wife Swap in 2003. After her appearance, Bardsley began making further and more frequent television appearances, and was most notably a member of Celebrity Fit Club, during the show's third series.

Media appearances

Mark and Lizzy Bardsley appeared in an episode of the first series of the Channel 4 programme Wife Swap, which was aired on 7 October 2003. Lizzy and her husband Mark caused controversy by being shown to be claiming £37,500 a year in benefits, while not working, and by frequent use of obscenities.

Following her appearance on Wife Swap, Bardsley appeared with many other reality TV stars in Five's Back to Reality. The following year, she took part in the third series of Celebrity Fit Club, and lost 1 stone 9 pounds.

In 2015, Bardsley appeared alongside Frank Windsor in the internet broadcast Banta thriller, Dangerous Ties. Bardsley played the role of temptress Lizzie Beard.

Legal issues 

In November 2004, Bardsley was accused of failing to inform the Department for Work and Pensions that she had earned money from TV and media appearances and was accused of being overpaid £4879.87. She denied the allegations and claimed that all the money she earned had been given to various charities and her sister. On 27 September 2004, Bardsley was found guilty of benefit fraud and sentenced to 80 hours community service and ordered to pay £2400 costs. She was also told to pay back the money.

In March 2006, Bardsley was arrested on suspicion of child cruelty. On 3 April, she was charged with 10 counts of child cruelty relating to offences between 1996 and 2005. Bardsley was found guilty at Bolton Crown Court of four charges of child cruelty on 23 January 2007, and on 23 February was given an eight-month suspended sentence for two years at Manchester Crown Court.

References

External links
 

1973 births
Living people
People from Milnrow